The Edie Adams Show (also Here's Edie ) is an American variety television show that ran on ABC from September 16, 1963, until March 19, 1964. Its time slot was Thursdays from 10 to 10:30 p.m. Eastern time. 

Edie Adams starred in the show. Regular performers were Don Chastain, Peter Hanley, the Paul Godkin Dancers, and the Randy Rayburn Singers. The Peter Matz Orchestra provided the music. 

On September 19, 1963, Adams and Sid Caesar appeared together in a one-hour program on ABC. Thereafter, Caesar's and Adams's programs alternated in the 10 p.m. Thursday time slot.

List of guest stars
Note: only the first appearance by the guest star is listed.

(1963–1964)

Zsa Zsa Gabor
Peter Falk
Bob Hope
Louis Nye
Sid Caesar
Duke Ellington
Eddie Fisher
Buddy Hackett
Sammy Davis Jr.
Dan Rowan
Bobby Darin
Nancy Wilson
Johnny Mathis
Soupy Sales
Dick Martin
Pat Fontaine
Al Hirt
Allan Sherman
Count Basie
André Previn
Charlie Brill

References

External links
 

1962 American television series debuts
1964 American television series endings
1960s American variety television series
American live television series
Black-and-white American television shows
English-language television shows